Micheal Douglas Williams (born July 23, 1966) is an American former  professional basketball player turned businessman who played the point guard position in the National Basketball Association (NBA). He holds the NBA record for most consecutive free throws made, with 97. Micheal Williams also founded Dallas based 3i Contracting, which has participated, built and/or developed over $1 billion worth of real estate throughout the state of Texas.

Out of Baylor University, Williams was selected with the 48th overall pick in the 1988 NBA draft by the Detroit Pistons with whom he played 49 games in his rookie season, averaging 2.4 points and 1.4 assists per game.  The Pistons won the NBA championship in his rookie year.

Williams was traded by Detroit to the Phoenix Suns on draft day of 1989, along with the Pistons' first-round draft pick (27th overall) of the 1989 NBA draft, Kenny Battle, in exchange for the Suns' first-round draft choice (24th overall pick), Anthony Cook. That season was spent split between the Phoenix Suns and the Charlotte Hornets averaging 5.6 points and 2.9 assists per game, before being acquired by the Indiana Pacers in 1990.

He thrived during his two seasons in Indiana, averaging 13.2 points, 6.5 assists and shooting 87.5% from the free-throw line. Prior to the 1992–93 season, he was traded along with Chuck Person to the Minnesota Timberwolves in exchange for Sam Mitchell and Pooh Richardson. He continued his solid play in Minnesota for the following two seasons but, due to various injuries, in his final four years with the Wolves he participated in just 35 games (including missing the entire 1996–97 season). On January 21, 1999 Minnesota traded him, along with Željko Rebrača, to the Toronto Raptors in a three-team deal. By then his career was on the decline, and he only played two games for the Raptors before retiring that year.

At the conclusion of 1992–93, Williams ranked fourth in the league in free-throw accuracy at 90.7 percent after making his final 84 attempts. In the process, he broke Calvin Murphy's 1981 record of 78 successive free throws, continuing his streak into the following season (1993–94), making his first 13 attempts. As of 2022 he still holds the NBA record for consecutive free throws made during the regular season at 97, spanning 19 regular-season games from March 24 to November 9, 1993.

Notes

External links
NBA.com profile
"Eluding Calvin's curse - Flashback: Micheal Williams' Streak" Basketball Digest,  April, 2003  by O'Donnell Chuck @ findarticles.com

1966 births
Living people
African-American basketball players
American expatriate basketball people in Canada
American men's basketball players
Basketball players from Dallas
Baylor Bears men's basketball players
Charlotte Hornets players
Detroit Pistons draft picks
Detroit Pistons players
Indiana Pacers players
Minnesota Timberwolves players
Phoenix Suns players
Point guards
Rapid City Thrillers players
Toronto Raptors players
21st-century African-American people
20th-century African-American sportspeople